The Egyptian Second Division is an Egyptian semi-professional football league representing the second tier of the Egyptian football league system until 2023. It is administered by the Egyptian Football Association. It is below the top professional league in the country, the Egyptian Premier League, and above the regional league Egyptian Third Division.

The league was reformed in 1977, and consists of multiple groups covering different parts of Egypt, with the winner of each group either gaining automatic promotion to the Egyptian Premier League, or earning a place in the promotion play-offs, depending on the number of groups.

In August 2022, the EFA announced that the league will be abolised following the conclusion of the 2022–23 season, and two new professional and semi-professional leagues, called Egyptian Second Division A and Egyptian Second Division B respectively, will be created and begin starting from the following season.

Previous Seasons

Promoted teams (from the Second Division to the Professional League)

Relegated Teams (from the Second Division to the Third Division)

Relegated Teams (from the Professional League to the Second Division)

Promoted Teams (from the Third Division to the Second Division)

Summary

References

External links
all about Egyptian football
All About Egyptian Players
best site about egyptianfootball
RSSSF competition history
Egyptian Premier League schedule, match results, and match downloads
Filgoal.com Egyptian Premier League Live And It is very fast scoreboard

 
2
Second level football leagues in Africa